Lakhimpur Kheri incident was a vehicle-ramming attack and mob lynching incident during farmers’ protest against the three farm laws passed by the Bharatiya Janata Party (BJP) led Union Government. It happened on 3 October 2021 at Banbirpur village near Tikunia in Lakhimpur Kheri district, Uttar Pradesh, India, resulting in deaths of eight people and injuries to ten others. Four protesting farmers and a journalist were run over by the car. Two BJP members and  Ajay Mishra Teni's driver were lynched by protestors in the subsequent violence.

Background
The 2020–2021 Indian farmers' protest is an ongoing protest against three farm acts which were passed by the BJP-led Union Government in the BJP controlled Parliament of India in September 2020.

In September 2021, Ajay Mishra Teni, a BJP leader and the Minister of State for Home Affairs was attending an event in the Palia town of Lakhimpur Kheri district. During the event, the farmer union members had shown black flags as a sign of protest. Teni had warned the protesting farmer union members in his speech saying, "Sudhar jao, nahi toh hum sudhaar denge, do minute me" (You better mend your ways, or we will teach you a lesson, it will only take a couple of minutes.) Tajinder Singh Virk,who is also linked to the Samajwadi Party, a farmer leader, later organised a protest against Teni's upcoming visit, in response to this warning. On 3 October, BJP leaders Ajay Mishra Teni and Keshav Prasad Maurya had planned to attend an event in the area. Keshav Prasad Maurya is the deputy chief minister of Uttar Pradesh.

Incident

On 3 October 2021, hundreds of farmers in the Tikonia area of Lakhimpur Kheri district were returning after staging protests as part of the 2020-2021 Indian farmers' protest against the three farm laws. The protestors were blocking state deputy chief minister Keshav Prasad Maurya's visit to Banbirpur village. The protestors walking on the road were hit and ran over from behind by a speeding Mahindra Thar, a SUV car. Two other vehicles in the convoy quickly followed the first car and crushed the injured who were lying on the ground. According to witnesses, gunshots were also fired. The protesters torched the Thar and Fortuner cars and killed three of its occupants, while the driver of the third car in the convoy, a Scorpio, fled the site with his car.

Total eight people died in the violence. Two farmers died on the spot while two more died later in the hospital. Ten farmers were injured. Raman Kashyap, a 28-year-old journalist working with the private TV news channel was among those killed.  According to his father and brother, Kashyap was hit by the car and grievously injured. Three persons in the minister's convoy (the driver of Ajay Mishra and two BJP workers) were lynched by the farmers subsequently. 

Two of these cars involved were owned by the union minister Ajay Kumar Mishra. According to the eyewitnesses the minister's son, Ashish Mishra, was in one of the cars in the convoy.

Investigation
Two First information reports (FIR) on the incident were filed in the Tikunia police station. The complainant alleged that the event was 'premeditated' and a "conspiracy was hatched by the minister" and his son. Ashish Mishra, along with around 20 unnamed men, was accused and charged with murder, criminal conspiracy, rash driving, and rioting among others. The charges listed in the FIR were Indian Penal Code  sections 147, 148, 149 (all three related to rioting), 279 (rash driving), 338 (causes grievous hurt to any person by doing any act so rashly or negligently as to endanger human life), 304A (causing death by negligence), 302 (murder), and 120B (party to a criminal conspiracy) Ashish Mishra, the son of Union Minister of State Ajay Mishra, was allegedly driving the car involved in the incident. Mishra had denied the charge and evaded police questioning for six days.

The Supreme Court heard the case after two lawyers from Uttar Pradesh wrote to Chief Justice N. V. Ramana, seeking a federal investigation into the incident. The Supreme Court criticised the Uttar Pradesh government and expressed dissatisfaction over the steps taken so far. The court also asked the police why the minister's son had not been arrested when he was accused of a serious crime of murder. Chief Justice Ramana speaking for the court disapproved of the Special Investigation Team (SIT) set up by the Uttar Pradesh government as "the people in the commission, they're all local officers". 

Ashish Mishra appeared for questioning before the SIT six days after the incident. He was arrested and taken to custody on 9 October 2021. Three more people were also arrested. On 12 October, he was taken to the violence site for reconstruction of the events. 

The forensic team of the investigators recovered two empty .315 firearm cartridges from Ashish's vehicle in the incident site. A forensic examination of the cartridges was sought. The presence of empty cartridges in his vehicle could not be explained by Ashish. Ashish was accused of shooting at the farmers. 

On October 15, four firearms, including a rifle belonging to Ashish Mishra (alias Monu Mishra) were recovered by the Uttar Pradesh Police. Among the weapons were a pistol owned by a nephew of a former Union minister and a repeater gun, held by the bodyguard of the nephew. A revolver was also recovered. Forensic tests conducted at the Forensic Science Laboratory (FSL) on the firearms confirmed that they were fired, but the report did not confirm if they were fired on the day of the violence. Among the 20 people accused in the police report, police have arrested 13. 

Raman Kashyap was in Tikunia to cover the rally but was killed in the violence. His brother Pawan Kashyap stated that the SIT investigation had found that his brother was crushed to death by a car and not lynched by farmers. Pawan filed a complaint with the police but no FIR was registered by the Police on his complaint. Pawan moved the court for instructions to the police for pressing charges related to Kashyap's death against 14 people, including the minister and his son. The complaint stated "As per eyewitnesses, the journalist was shot at while he was covering the car. Gunshots can be heard in the footage as well".

On 15 November 2021, the Supreme Court directed Uttar Pradesh government to "upgrade" the SIT with more senior police officers and include a retired judge "to ensure proper investigation". 

On November 25, 2021, afternoon, the new SIT,  consisting of SB Shiradkar,  Indian Police Service (IPS) 1993,  Additional Director General of Police head of  Uttar Pradesh  Police intelligence, posted in Lucknow; Padmaja Chauhan,  IPS of 1998 batch,  posted as  Inspector General Police (IG), recruitment board; Preetinder Singh,  IPS 2004 batch, Punjab cadre currently posted as Deputy Inspector General  of Police(DIG) in Saharanpur range,  visited the crime scene in the Tikunia village, and met amongst others, with Upendra Agarwal, (DIG)  the  former head of the SIT. The three IPS officers,   were  accompanied by  Rakesh Kumar Jain retired judge of Punjab and Haryana High Court   who had been appointed by Chief Justice NV Ramana to  “ensure impartiality and independence of the investigation.”  

On December 15, Senior Prosecution Officer (SPO) SP Yadav  told the media   that  the Chief Investigator of the SIT Vidyaram Diwakar (Inspector Crime Branch, Kheri), probing Tikunia violence has  moved an application in the court of Chief Judicial Magistrate Chinta Ram.  In the  application the chief investigator   has stated   that  causing death  by   ramming a vehicle into  the farmers was "not an act of negligence or carelessness." but   "a pre-planned conspiracy".  The  chief investigator in the application  recommended  that  the earlier IPC sections in the FIR namely sections 279( Rash driving or riding on a public way), 338(Whoever causes grievous hurt to any person by doing any act so rashly or negligently)  and 304A(Causing death by negligence)  be   replaced  with IPC sections  307 (attempt to murder), 326 (voluntarily causing grievous hurt by dangerous weapons),  34 (Acts done by several persons in furtherance of common intention), and sections 3/25/30 of the Arms Act.

On January 3, 2022 The SIT filed a  5000 page charge-sheet against 14 people, including Union Minister Ajay Mishra’s son Ashish Mishra , who has been named the main accused. The charge-sheet was submitted in the court of Chief Judicial Magistrate  Chinta Ram.  in addition to Ashish Mishra  the  charge-sheet names Ankit Das, Nandan Singh Bisht, Satyam Tripathi, alias Satyam, Latif, alias Kale, Shekhar Bharti, Sumit Jaiswal, Ashish Pandey, Lavkush Rana, Shishu Pal, Ullas Kumar, alias Mohit Trivedi, Rinku Rana and Dharmendra Banjara. In addition to these  names Virendra Shukla’s name has been added in the chargesheet under  IPC Section 201 (causing disappearance of evidence). The court accepted the charge sheet and fixed January 10 as the next date of hearing.

Aftermath 
An alleged video of the incident shared by BJP parliamentarian Varun Gandhi showed a vehicle ramming unarmed protesters from behind.

On 9 October, the farmer unions termed the violence an "act of terror" that was part of a larger conspiracy to break the ten-month-old farmers' protest. The union stated, this "massacre" during the farmer's movement was analogous to the Jallianwala Bagh massacre during the Indian independence movement. The unions and Samyukt Kisan Morcha (SKM) planned several protests calling for the immediate dismissal and arrest of Union minister Ajay Mishra Teni and his son Ashish. Rashtriya Lok Dal president Jayant Chaudhary, called the incident "not less than a terror attack". Opposition parties held protest meetings against the Lakhimpur Kheri violence. Canadian MP Sukh Dhaliwal, shaken by the video of the incident, called it a terror attack no different than London, Ontario truck attack.

Editors Guild of India (EGI) demanded a probe by a court-led special investigative team on the death of the journalist and asked the media to report facts. The EGI stated, "In what is clearly a terror attack meant to spread fear amongst the farmers, the killing of Kashyap raises many questions. The Editors Guild demands that the death of Kashyap be separately probed by a Court-led special investigation team to ascertain the circumstances of his death and also attempt to recover and use the footage of his camera to build the sequence of events leading to his death. EGI is concerned about the varying versions of the incident in different sections of the media. It is imperative for the media to report the facts and not versions."

Calls for removal of Teni from Home ministry post
On November 26, 2021 the Delhi Legislative Assembly passed a resolution demanding the sacking of MoS Ajay Misra from his post of Minister of State.

Several opposition leaders and farmer groups have questioned why Teni has not been removed from his post and asked PM Modi to sack Teni; while others have also demanded his arrest. Modi has not responded to these calls. On 8 November, A lawyer through his submission, informed the Supreme court that the accused of Lakhimpur Kheri incident were "at large roaming scot-free" as they "wielded the thunderbolt of police power through political clout."

Notes

Reference

Lakhimpur Kheri district
2021 road incidents
2020s road incidents in Asia
Attacks in India in 2021
2020–2021 Indian farmers' protest
October 2021 events in India  
Road incidents in India
History of Uttar Pradesh (1947–present)